Knocks at My Door is a 1994 Venezuelan drama film directed by Alejandro Saderman. Adapted from the play by Juan Carlos Gené, the film was selected as the Venezuelan entry for the Best Foreign Language Film at the 67th Academy Awards, but was not accepted as a nominee.

Plot
A fugitive bursts into the home of two Catholic nuns. In an attempt to save his life, they hide him from the marauding military patrols, despite the danger they face if they are caught.

Cast
 Verónica Oddó as Ana
 Elba Escobar as Ursula
 Juan Carlos Gené as Mayor Cerone
 José Antonio Rodríguez as Obispo
 Ana Castell as Severa
 Mirta Ibarra as Amanda
 Frank Spano as Pablo

Year-end lists
 Honorable mention – William Arnold, Seattle Post-Intelligencer

See also
 List of submissions to the 67th Academy Awards for Best Foreign Language Film
 List of Venezuelan submissions for the Academy Award for Best Foreign Language Film

References

External links
 

1994 films
1994 drama films
Venezuelan drama films
1990s Spanish-language films